"Flame" is a song by English band Sundara Karma. It was originally released on 4 June 2015 as a standalone single, and re-released on 11 November 2016 as the lead single for their debut studio album, Youth Is Only Ever Fun in Retrospect on Sony Music via RCA imprint Chess Club Records.

Critical reception 
In 2015 review, George O'Brien praised the track, calling the track "punchy", and the band "picking up where they left off" with their first extended play.

Music video 
The original music video came out on 7 July 2015. The second music video for the re-released single came out on 26 December 2016.

In other media 
"Flame" appears in the EA Sports FIFA 18 soundtrack.

Track listing

Credits and personnel 
The following individuals were credited with the recording, composition, and mastering of the track.

Sundara Karma
 Ally Baty — Guitar
 Dom Cordell — Bass
 Haydn Evans — Drums
 Matt Maltese — Piano
 Oscar Pollock — Guitar, vocals

Recording and Mastering

 Lucas Donaud — Artwork, Design
 Jasmine Igoe — Photography
 Emma Viola Lilja — Photography
 Phil Smithies — Photography
 Nick Watson — Mastering

References

External links 
 
 
 

2015 singles
2015 songs
2016 singles
Sundara Karma songs
Sony Music singles
Song recordings produced by Stuart Price